Satya Prasad Majumder is a Bangladeshi academic. He is the current and the 14th Vice-chancellor of Bangladesh University of Engineering and Technology.

Education 
Majumder completed his B.Sc. in 1981 as an Electrical and Electronic Engineer, and later joined as a faculty of Bangladesh University of Engineering and Technology. He was awarded the talent pool scholarship during his 4 years of honors for his excellent achievements as a student. He also completed his M.Sc. there in 1985, where his research was mainly focused on Microprocessor controlled telephone branch exchange. In 1987, he was awarded scholarship by the Government of India to enroll as a PhD student at the Indian institute of Technology (IIT), Kharagpur and continue his research work in Fiber Optics at Centre for Research and Training in Radar and Communications situated on that university. He also received funding from Italian National Research Council under Parma University to support his PhD on telecommunication project.

Career 
After 1991, Majumder rejoined Bangladesh University of Engineering and Technology and continued to serve it by taking various responsibilities. He particularly taught courses on telecommunications, namely Optical Communications, Analog and Digital Electronics, Advanced Electronics, Digital Communications, Satellite Communications, Electrical Circuits and Systems, Instrumentation & Control Systems, Power System Analysis, Electrical Machines, Laser Theory, Telecommunication Engineering, Advanced Telecommunication Engineering, Coding and Information Theory.

Aside from teaching, Majumder also handled different administrative responsibilities. He was the head of the EEE Department in two consecutive years from June 2006 to May 2008. He has also completed his term as the Director of Student Welfare in 2018. He is currently the chairman in Communication Society of IEEE Bangladesh Section.

He served as faculty in many different private universities of Bangladesh, like - Presidency University, Bangladesh Army University of Science and Tech (BAUST), Military Institution of Science and Technology, Ranada Prasad Shaha University (RPSU) to name some few. He has also worked as a visiting faculty of different universities abroad, like- Multimedia University, Malaysia, Gunma University, Japan, University of Parma, Italy, etc.

He has authored more than 200 publications and also supervised more than 100 thesis and dissertations in different field of optics, especially in Optoelectronics & Photonics, Optical Fiber Communication Systems, Optical Networks, Solution propagation, Satellite Communications, Mobile and Infrared communications, etc.

Consultancy 
As one of the early pioneer in Optoelectronics of Bangladesh, he did some consultancy works in institutes like- Asia IT&C Program, South Asian Association for Regional Cooperations (SAARC) & Dhaka Chamber of Commerce (DCC). He is currently serving as one of the board of directors in Bangladesh Telecommunication Company Limited (BTCL), under the Bangladesh government.

References 

Living people
Academic staff of Bangladesh University of Engineering and Technology
Vice-Chancellors of Bangladesh University of Engineering and Technology
Place of birth missing (living people)
1958 births
Bangladeshi Hindus